Redburn is a village in Northumberland, England about  west of Bardon Mill.
The most notable feature of Redburn is Redburn Park, which was refurbished in August 2010. It is also the location of a roadside branch of Starbucks and a BP Garage that serve the A69.

Governance 

Redburn is in the parliamentary constituency of Hexham.

See also
Stanegate

References

External links

Villages in Northumberland